The 1913 Purdue Boilermakers football team was an American football team that represented Purdue University during the 1913 college football season. In their first season under head coach Andy Smith, the Boilermakers compiled a 4–1–2 record, finished in fourth place in the Western Conference with a 2–1–2 record against conference opponents, and outscored their opponents by a total of 171 to 20. G. E. Glossop was the team captain.

Schedule

References

Purdue
Purdue Boilermakers football seasons
Purdue Boilermakers football